Daniel Samuilovich (Semyonovich) Komissarov (1907, Bokhara-2008) is a renowned Russian Iranologist and distinguished professor of Persian literature.

He acted as a professor at Leningrad University for years and was a member of USSR academy of science. Komissarov worked significantly on the literary works of Sadeq Hedayat. He translated works of classical Persian poets as Rudaki and modern writers as Simin Daneshvar, Sadeq Choubak and Said Nafisi.

Notes

See also
Iranian culture
Iranistics

1907 births
2008 deaths
People from Lebap Region
Iranologists
20th-century Russian historians
Russian Jews
Soviet literary historians
Soviet male writers
20th-century Russian male writers
Burials in Troyekurovskoye Cemetery